North Madison is a neighborhood of Madison, Indiana, in the United States.

History
North Madison was platted in 1846. A post office was established at North Madison in 1848, and remained in operation until it was discontinued in 1957.

References

Populated places in Jefferson County, Indiana